The Lost Masters is the first compilation album by American rapper and producer Kool Keith. It was released on August 26, 2003, via DMAFT Records. A sequel to the album, The Lost Masters, Vol. 2, was released on August 9, 2005.

Track listing

Personnel 
 Keith Matthew Thornton – main artist
 Jeff May – design & layout
 Carl Caprioglio – photography

References

External links 

Kool Keith albums
2003 compilation albums
Hip hop compilation albums